The Hexagon Pool (Breichat HaMeshushim) is a natural pool by the Meshushim River in  the Yehudiya Forest Nature Reserve, the central Golan Heights.

The pool, at the bottom of a canyon, is named after the shape of the hexagonal basalt columns that make up its walls. This geological formation was created by the slow cooling of layers of lava flows over a long period. When the lava solidified and cooled, it was split into polygonal shapes due to its contraction.

Geology 
A cascade of water, such as a waterfall, created the pool. The walls are columns of basalt in angular formations that appear man-made. Walls of basalt columns exist in other places in the Golan Heights, along the Meshushim (Hexagons) and Zavitan Rivers.

Hiking
From there a 30-minute downhill walk leads to the pool.

Access to the pool is normally allowed. The water temperature rarely exceeds , even in summer.

See also
 List of places with columnar basalt

References

External links

 Israel Nature and Parks Authority
 Israel travel secrets
 Society for the Protection of Nature in Israel (Hebrew)

National parks of Israel
Natural pools
Columnar basalts
Golan Heights